There are a body of films that feature the United States Navy SEALs. The box office successes of Act of Valor in 2012 and Lone Survivor in 2013 led studios to seek out more real-life accounts of Navy SEALs to portray on film. Director Clint Eastwood released American Sniper in late 2014, and Eric Blehm's book about a SEAL Team Six operator, Fearless, also attracted attention from studios. Hollie McKay at Fox News wrote, "Within much of the SEAL community, there is still great hesitancy with regards to the slew of books and films being written and made about their operations. After all, it is not a profession one seeks for fame or fortune."

List of films
The following films are listed alphabetically:

Actors with recurring Navy SEALs roles

 Michael Biehn played a Navy SEAL in: The Abyss, Navy SEALs and The Rock
 Cam Gigandet played a Navy SEAL in: Seal Team Six: The Raid on Osama Bin Laden and Without Remorse
 Michael B. Jordan played a Navy SEAL in: Black Panther and Without Remorse
 Chris Pratt played a Navy SEAL in: Zero Dark Thirty and The Terminal List
 Taylor Kitsch played a Navy SEAL in: Lone Survivor, American Assassin and The Terminal List

See also

 The Frogmen, a 1951 film featuring operations by United States Navy Underwater Demolition Teams, the forerunners to the Navy SEALs
 SEAL Team, a CBS TV drama series (2017–present)
 Six, a History TV series (2017–2018)
 The Terminal List, an Amazon Prime Video TV series (2022)

References

External links
For Navy SEALs, The Biggest Threat May Be Hollywood at Newsweek (November 5, 2012)

United States Navy SEALs, list of films featuring the